A Piece of Heaven (German: Ein Stück vom Himmel) is a 1957 West German romance film directed by Rudolf Jugert and starring Ingrid Andree, Toni Sailer and Margit Saad.

The film's sets were designed by the art directors Franz Bi and Bruno Monden. It was shot at the Bavaria Studios in Munich and on location around the city, as well as at the Schloss Höhenried and Lake Starnberg.

Cast
 Ingrid Andree as Christine von Pröhl
 Toni Sailer as Peter Keller
 Margit Saad as Erika
 Boy Gobert as Sir Jackie Taft-Holery
 Erik Schumann as Ronald Henning
 Chariklia Baxevanos as Das Mädchen Elfriede
 Gustav Knuth as Ludwig von Pröhl
 Rudolf Vogel as Herr Müller
 Paul Henckels as Kammerdiener Josephus
 Margarete Haagen as Dame im Auto
 Hans Hermann Schaufuß as LKW-Fahrer
 Iska Geri as Kellnerin
 Liesl Karlstadt as Dame am Bahnhof
 Georg Thomalla as Willi
 Horst Buchholz a Cabrio-Fahrer 
 Günther Lüders as Kellner

References

Bibliography
 Bock, Hans-Michael & Bergfelder, Tim. The Concise CineGraph. Encyclopedia of German Cinema. Berghahn Books, 2009.

External links 

1957 films
1957 drama films
1950s German-language films
Films directed by Rudolf Jugert
Bavaria Film films
Films shot at Bavaria Studios
West German films
1950s German films